Rockside is a rural locality in the Lockyer Valley Region, Queensland, Australia.

History 
Rockside Provisional School on 2 June 1902 with Henry Arthur Trone as the first teacher. On 1 January 1909 it became Rockside State School. It closed on 5 April 1921. The school building was relocated to Ropeley East.

In 1932, there were 12 children in the district and a new school was requested. In February 1936, tenders were called to erect a new school at Rockdale. The school building was completed by early June 1936. In late June 1936, it was announced that the school would also serve as the Rockdale Post Office. On 8 July 1936, the school re-opened still using the name Rockdale State School. On Saturday 12 September 1936, the school was officially opened by Ted Maher, the Member of the Queensland Legislative Assembly representing Rosewood, who gave a speech encouraging people to have more children to reverse the falling birthrate. It was followed by a picnic. The school closed on 16 March 1952.

References

Further reading 

 

Lockyer Valley Region
Localities in Queensland